Veerabahuthrips is a genus of thrips in the family Phlaeothripidae.

Species
 Veerabahuthrips bambusae
 Veerabahuthrips clarus
 Veerabahuthrips crassipes
 Veerabahuthrips exilis
 Veerabahuthrips fruticola
 Veerabahuthrips longicornis
 Veerabahuthrips simplex
 Veerabahuthrips tridentatus

References

Phlaeothripidae
Thrips
Thrips genera